Punctularia strigosozonata is a fungus species of the genus Punctularia. It was originally described in 1832 by Lewis David de Schweinitz as a member of genus Merulius. Patrick Talbot transferred it to genus Punctularia in 1958. Punctularia strigosozonata produces the antibiotic phlebiarubrone.

References 

Corticiales
Fungi described in 1832
Taxa named by Lewis David de Schweinitz